Battlehawk may refer to:
The Battlehawks, a fictional fighter squadron in the video game Secret Weapons Over Normandy
Battlehawks 1942, a video game
The Battlehawk, a fictional aircraft carrier featured in the television series Terrahawks
Battle Hawk, a Japanese television series
Battlehawk, a drone capable of being backpack carried, directed to targets, and delivering explosives
St. Louis BattleHawks, professional American football team competing in the XFL